The 2021 Arkansas Razorbacks softball team represents the University of Arkansas in the 2021 NCAA Division I softball season. The Razorbacks are led by sixth-year head coach Courtney Deifel and play their home games at Bogle Park.

Previous season
The Razorbacks had a record of 19–6 overall, and 1–2 in the SEC, when the 2020 season was cancelled due to the COVID-19 pandemic.

Personnel

Roster

Schedule and results

SEC Tournament

NCAA Fayetteville Regional

Rankings

See also
2021 Arkansas Razorbacks baseball team

Notes

References

Arkansas
Arkansas Razorbacks softball seasons
Arkansas Razorbacks softball
Arkansas